Etherstack is a provider of wireless communications software to the Professional/Land Mobile Radio and defence industries in Europe, Asia and North America. Their products cover wireless protocol stacks, IP-based communication networks, cryptographic communication solutions, Software Defined Radio (SDR) and Software Communications Architecture (SCA) compatible waveforms. Etherstack provides these software technologies to defence organisations and commercial manufacturers, such as Icom, Inc.; the Swedish Defence Material Administration; and Raytheon JPS.

History 

Etherstack originated in 1995 as a provider of hardware-independent protocol stacks, including MPT-1327, TETRA and APCO P25. In 2001, a software abstraction of the TETRA protocol stack developed by Etherstack was used by Racal (now part of Thales) in the development of a covert TETRA radio, designed for use by police and special forces.

In 2006, Etherstack joined with Aeroflex to develop and market products for performing conformance tests against the TIA P25 protocol.

On March 28, 2007, Icom, Inc. announced that they had signed a long-term MOU with Etherstack to work together on digital radio projects for various professional markets.

Etherstack began work with the safety and security business unit of Cisco Systems in late 2007 on the development of a range of public safety radio network infrastructure products aimed at the first responder segment of North American markets.

In 2008, Etherstack signed a second contract with the Swedish Defence Material Administration for the continued development and support of a TETRA-based mobile station using Etherstack's TETRA SCA waveform as part of the US Swedish JTRS co-operation project.

The National Law Enforcement and Corrections Technology Center Communications Technologies Center of Excellence announced in January 2009 that it would launch a pilot of the APCO P25 radio network in Cape May County, New Jersey, that would integrating Etherstack's Land Mobile Radio network controller software.

In March 2011, Etherstack and Alcatel-Lucent demonstrated a world first of integration of a native P25 PTT call over an LTE cellular network through to a traditional narrowband P25 network using the ISSI standard at the Bell Labs facility in New Jersey.

Etherstack has been incorporated since 2006, with its corporate headquarters in London. The company operates research and development offices in New York, London, Barcelona, Yokohama, and Sydney.

Products 
Etherstack produces SCA Software-defined radio (SDR) waveforms, Land Mobile Radio (LMR) protocol stacks, test platforms, and encryption solutions for the P25, TETRA, and MPT-1327 protocols.

See also 
 Software-defined radio
 Land Mobile Radio
 Software Communications Architecture

References

External links 
 

Communication software